Daniel Tonga Faleafa (born 13 February 1989) is a Tongan rugby union player. He plays in the flanker and occasionally lock position for the France based Pro D2 side, Colomiers. Faleafa also represents Tonga at international level.

Early years 

Daniel Faleafa attended Mt Roskill Grammar School and Mount Albert Grammar School in Auckland. He played for the New Zealand national schoolboy rugby union team in 2007.

Playing career 

Daniel Faleafa is a powerful and athletic backrower who is very adept at playing lock due to his brilliant lineout ability. He started off as a member of the Auckland Rugby Academy and in 2009 was a key member of the New Zealand national under-20 rugby union team that won the 2009 IRB Junior World Championship. Daniel joined Northland in on loan in 2009 where he played 1 ITM Cup game before returning to Auckland to make another 2 ITM Cup appearances that same season. Faleafa joined Northland full-time from 2010 and made 15 appearances over the next three seasons.

International career 

Faleafa is a former New Zealand representative at Secondary School and Under-20 level. In 2013 he was named to play for Tonga in the 2013 IRB Pacific Nations Cup.

References

External links 
 
 

1989 births
Living people
New Zealand rugby union players
Rugby union players from Auckland
New Zealand sportspeople of Tongan descent
Tonga international rugby union players
US Colomiers players
Rugby union flankers
Rugby union locks